Lê Chí Thức has been a spokesperson for the Government of Free Vietnam since 1998-2002.

Biography

In April 1975, during the invasion of South Vietnam by the Communist North Vietnamese Army and the Viet Cong, Thuc and his family fled from Saigon during the fighting.

He had petitioned the United States Embassy for Political asylum and was allowed to immigrate to the United States because he feared for his life living under the Communist Vietnamese.

Life in exile
Thuc currently has campaigned throughout the United States, to the Vietnamese-American community to bring democracy to Vietnam.

He has also made trips to exile Vietnamese Communities, located in France, Germany, the Netherlands, Denmark, Sweden, and Australia, where he has received a significant amount of support for the Government of Free Vietnam.

He has been invited to Washington D.C., to speak on behalf of the Government of Free Vietnam, to set up Congressional Hearings concerning Human Rights violations in Vietnam and petitioned for the release of Vo Duc Van, who is currently in a Federal Detention Facility in California.

Thuc has a weekly radio show that is broadcast worldwide on Human Rights and democratic issues about Vietnam on Radio Free Vietnam.

He currently has been representing the new policies of former Head of State and General of South Vietnam Nguyen Khanh, who currently serves as the Chief of State of the Government of Free Vietnam.

Quotes
"To live in Vietnam under Communism is not to live but to suffer."
"Freedom is only worth living if you can share it with your Countrymen."

External links
Government of Free Vietnam Official Site
BEFORE 5,000 FELLOW COUNTRYMEN GENERAL NGUYEN KHANH TOOK OATH OF OFFICE AS GOVERNMENT OF VN CHIEF OF STATE

Le Chi Thuc
Le Chi Thuc
Vietnamese emigrants to the United States
Vietnamese people of the Vietnam War
Le Chi Thuc
Living people
Year of birth missing (living people)